Tewe may refer to:

Tewe is a dialect, see Manyika dialect
Ralph Tewe, English MP in 1301 and 1302

See also
Tewes, surname page